Sir William Comer Petheram   (1835 – 15 May 1922) was the Chief Justice of Calcutta High Court and Vice Chancellor of University of Calcutta. He was made a Knight Bachelor in 1884.

Career
Petheram was born in 1835 in Lympsham, Somerset, the son of William Petheram of Pinhoe. In 1862 he was qualified as Special Pleader and passed from Middle Temple in 1869. He joined service as Chief Judge of the Chief Court of North-Western Provinces in India. Petheram first served as Chief justice of Allahabad High Court in 1884 to 1886 then became the Chief Justice of Calcutta High Court on 24 March 1886 after Sir Richard Garth and retired in November 1896. In 1887-90 he was also the Vice Chancellor of the Calcutta University. In 1864, he wrote a book named The law and practice relating to discovery by interrogatories under the Common law procedure act, 1854.

He was knighted in 1884. 

He married Isabel Congreve, daughter of Sir William Congreve, 2nd Baronet.

References

1835 births
1922 deaths
Knights Bachelor
Members of the Middle Temple
British India judges
Judges of the Calcutta High Court
19th-century Indian judges
Chief Justices of the Calcutta High Court
19th-century English judges
English barristers
People from Lympsham
Date of birth missing